Marlyson Conceição Oliveira (born 13 January 1999) is a Brazilian professional footballer who plays as a forward for Vorskla Poltava on loan from Figueirense.

References

External links

1999 births
Living people
Brazilian footballers
Brazilian expatriate footballers
Association football forwards
Joinville Esporte Clube players
Paraná Clube players
Figueirense FC players
FC Metalist 1925 Kharkiv players
FC Vorskla Poltava players
Associação Atlética Ponte Preta players
Campeonato Brasileiro Série B players
Campeonato Brasileiro Série C players
Ukrainian Premier League players
Expatriate footballers in Ukraine
Brazilian expatriate sportspeople in Ukraine